Bruno Geddo is an Italian national, born in Novara in 1959. He has served with the United Nations High Commissioner for Refugees (UNHCR) for over 30 years in Sub-Saharan Africa, North Africa and the Middle East.

After completing his degree in law in Milan,  Geddo was assigned to Sudan as a JPO with UNHCR (1988-1991), covering the Ethiopian refugee crisis in Eastern Sudan and then from Khartoum as Associate Protection Officer. Between 1991 and 1993, he was posted as Protection Officer to Dar es Salaam, Tanzania, where he organized the return of South African refugees and exiles who had fled the apartheid regime, and started preparations for the voluntary repatriation of Mozambican refugees.  He also conducted the census of Burundi refugees in camps and spearheaded the humanitarian response to the first inflow of Somali refugees. In 1994-1996, he served in UNHCR Headquarters, Geneva, as Senior Legal Advisor to the Africa Bureau covering Eastern Africa and the Horn, the Great Lakes Region and Southern Africa. From 1997 to 2001, Geddo was UNHCR Assistant Regional Representative (Protection) in Pretoria, South Africa, responsible for refugee protection issues in Southern Africa (Angola, Botswana, Lesotho, Madagascar, and Mozambique, Namibia, Swaziland, Zimbabwe). In South Africa, in particular, Geddo represented UNHCR in the expert panel advising the Department of Home Affairs on the drafting of the 1998 Refugee Act, and was instrumental in the Department's efforts to scale up capacity to deal with the backlog in asylum claims, and supported the South African Human Rights Commission in the design and implementation of the Roll Back Xenophobia campaign. Geddo spent the subsequent four years back in Geneva as Head of the Legal Advice Unit, Africa Bureau, providing position papers and legal advice on international refugee law and protection policy to senior management.
 
From 2005-2008, Geddo served as UNHCR Representative in the Central African Republic. He led the UNHCR response to the internal displacement crisis by setting up the first Protection Cluster in 2006, pursuant to the UN humanitarian coordination reform. He also managed the care and maintenance program for camp-based refugees from the Democratic Republic of Congo and the support program for urban refugees from Burundi, Rwanda, and the Republic of Congo. He oversaw voluntary repatriation of Chadian, Congolese and Sudanese refugees.  Geddo also undertook several special missions in Darfur, Sudan (internally displaced persons and Chadian refugees) (2005), Limpopo, South Africa (Zimbabwean refugees and migrants) (2008), and Dadaab, Kenya (Somali refugees) (2009), then the largest refugee complex in the world. 

Geddo became UNHCR Representative for Somalia in 2009, based in Nairobi and then Mogadishu, leading the UNHCR humanitarian response to multiple internal displacement crises across the country and dealing with large-scale urban refugees in and mixed migration flows out of Puntland and Somaliland, as well as initial planning for the possible return of Somali refugees from Kenya and Djibouti. Geddo also spearheaded a local integration program based on permanent shelter for internally displaced persons in Central Somalia, supported by the UN Peacebuilding Fund. Furthermore, within the UN humanitarian coordination system, Geddo managed the UNHCR emergency response to the 2011/12 famine in South-Central Somalia, the worst since 1992. 

In 2013, Geddo moved on to Yemen as UNHCR Representative a.i. Covering multiple refugee and internal displacement situations and an extensive program for Ethiopian, Eritrean and Somali refugees in urban areas. He also dealt with the continuing mixed migration crisis from the Horn of Africa to the Arabian peninsula, in which Yemen was the pivotal transit hub. In this context, Geddo spearheaded preparations for the first international conference on mixed migration in the Gulf, organized by the Yemeni government with the technical support of UNHCR. Geddo was later appointed as UNHCR Representative to Mauritania (2014-2015) where he dealt with camp-based Tuareg and Arab refugees from Mali in the Sahel and West African refugees based in urban areas. Furthermore, he spearheaded consultations with refugees on the Mali peace process, including discussions on a possible Tripartite Agreement between Mauritania, Mali and UNHCR governing voluntary repatriation and participation of a refugee delegation from Mauritania in the Mali peace process.

From mid-2015 to 2019, Geddo was UNHCR Representative to Iraq, leading the UNHCR emergency preparedness and response to the rolling displacement crises arising from military activity to retake ISIS-held territory, in the framework of the UN Humanitarian Response Plan. In all, a total of five million internally displaced people were recorded over a four-year period (one million evacuated from Mosul city alone), one of the largest and most complex humanitarian crises in recent years. At the same time, Geddo oversaw the UNHCR operation to support reintegration of internally displaced families who had started to return to their areas of origin, through cash grants, shelter repair and rehabilitation of basic infrastructure. This was complemented by technical support to the Ministry of Home Affairs to issue fresh identity documents to displaced persons who had lost them during the war. Furthermore, in the post-conflict period, Geddo led the sustainable return and social cohesion working groups pursuant to the UN Recovery and Resilience Programme in preparation for the 2018 Iraq Reconstruction Conference. In parallel, Geddo managed the UNHCR programme to provide protection and assistance to up to 230,000 Syrian refugees in the Kurdistan Region of Iraq and 10,000 Palestinian refugees in South-Central Iraq.

RELATED MATERIAL

- La strada in salita - book by Bruno Geddo

Wings and roots. These are the first words we find at the beginning of this story. In them is epitomized all the power of education: providing children with firm roots and then wings to fly. Since childhood Bruno Geddo liked to look up, he was fascinated by bell towers and domes, he pointed to the moon and in the prescient words of his great-grandfather, there is all his future “I will not be there anymore, but one day this child will go far”. And so it literally was. Engaged for thirty years on the humanitarian front with the United Nations refugee agency (UNHCR), starting with the Junior Professional Officer program run by the Italian Ministry of Foreign Affairs, then the new life in Sudan, the Ethiopian refugees fleeing war and famine, the interventions of the humanitarian agencies of the United Nations and non-governmental organizations. A story that intertwines those of women, men and children, woven with suffering and sacrifice, battles for the defense of human rights, ethnic and religious wars, life in refugee camps, encounters with migrants, the fear of ISIS attacks, the inhumanity of terrorism. Stories of wounded people and countries, from Yemen to Iraq, from Somalia to Mauritania, from the Central African Republic to the Democratic Republic of Congo, to tell us of brutality and dedication, of hunger and modesty, of sand and wind, of injustice and indifference and despite everything, of Beauty and Love for Life. There are also more “technical” chapters, which elaborate on some of the themes addressed in the book, clarifying the context for the reader.

- UNHCR Podcast interview

Unhcr.org: https://www.unhcr.org/awakeatnight/season-2-episode-3-bruno-geddo/

- Kurdistan tv profile interview 

Twitter (English): https://twitter.com/UNHCRIraq/status/1101462358315229185

Twitter (Arabic): https://twitter.com/UNHCRIraq/status/1101461990877339648

References

Living people
1959 births
People from Milan
United Nations High Commissioner for Refugees officials
Italian officials of the United Nations

La strada in salita
https://www.amazon.it/dp/8830647993/ref=cm_sw_r_awdo_navT_a_M6Z86KYWSWR5EJV7ACJT